The Paper Cranes are a Canadian indie pop band from Victoria, British Columbia. The band is composed of the husband and wife duo of Ryan McCullagh (Guitar, Bass, Vocals) and Miranda Roach (Keyboard, Drum Sequencing). Despite several line-up changes during their career the group remains centered on the husband-wife team. The band take their name from the book, Sadako and the Thousand Paper Cranes by Eleanor Coerr.

History
The band was formed in January 2005 by multi-instrumentalist Ryan McCullagh (Vocals, Guitar, Keyboard), James Watson (Drums), John Quissy (Bass), and Mark Vondrasek (Guitar). The group recorded 5 demo songs together including early versions of "I'll Love You Until My Veins Explode", "Out On The Horse Tracks", and, "Deus Ex Machinegun"  which circulated on the internet though the recordings were never officially released.

In the summer of 2005 Greg Ipp, a Toronto DJ and music blogger, founded Unfamiliar Records and signed The Paper Cranes. In the autumn of that year Miranda Roach joined the group as their keyboard player.  Following some opening slots for Wolf Parade and Pretty Girls Make Graves the band recorded their untitled debut EP usually referred to as the "Veins EP." The Album was recorded at Mushroom Studios in Vancouver BC and was engineered and produced by Howard Redekopp. In December 2005 Ryan and Miranda were married.

The Veins Ep was released on Unfamiliar Records as the label's first release in the spring of 2006. The single, "Ill Love You Until My Veins Explode" was given a 4 star rating by Pitchfork. Shortly after, Mark Vondrasek left the band and a few months later, following the band's first Canadian tour James Watson and John Quissy both left as well to finish their degrees at the University of Victoria.

In 2007, The Paper Cranes recruited Braeden Paterson (Guitar), Mark Lavoie (Bass), and Evan Middleton (Drums) to record their first full-length album, Halcyon Days. The album was recorded at The Hive Studio in Burnaby, BC by Jessie Gander over 3 days. Most of the album was recorded live from the studio floor. Shortly after the recording of Halcyon Days, "I'll Love You Until My Veins Explode" and "Milkrun" from the Veins Ep were released in the UK as the double-A side single, "I'll Love You Until My Veins Explode/Milkrun" on the Longest Mile label, owned in part by Ross Millard of The Futureheads.  Halcyon Days was released in February 2008 on Unfamiliar Records.

After the release of "Halcyon Days" Evan Middleton left the band. Mark Lavoie continued to perform with The Paper Cranes but subsequently left to tour with fellow Victoria musicians, Maurice.

James Alexander Bodman and Jeffrey Mitchelmore of the Victoria indie-rock band, The Racoons joined the group in 2008 and both can be heard on The Paper Cranes' 2009 online-only single, "Telephone."

In the August 2009 The Paper Cranes released their second full-length album, Chivalry's Dead on Unfamiliar Records. The album was recorded over 2 months in the Spring of 2009 at Mankind Studio in Victoria BC. Grand Piano on the album was recorded at The Victoria Conservatory of Music.

Shortly after the release of Chivalry's Dead, citing scheduling conflicts with the supporting band's other musical projects, The Paper Cranes' core members Miranda Roach and Ryan McCullagh restructured the band as a duet utilizing drum loops and electronic instruments to take the place of live back-up musicians.

In the fall of 2008, "Rabbit in a Snare" from the band's "Veins" Ep was featured in a Canadian television commercial for the Nissan Rogue and in 2009 The Paper Cranes were voted Victoria's Favorite Band at the 2009 Monday Magazine M Awards.

In 2009, "Rabbit in a Snare" from the "Veins" EP (2006) was featured in the documentary "Don't you forget about me" by Alliance films outlining the life and work of screenwriter, director, and producer John Hughes 
 
Their music has been playlisted on CBC Radio 3.

Discography

Albums
Halcyon Days (2008)
Chivalry's Dead (2009)

Extended plays
Veins (2006)

Singles
I'll Love You Until My Veins Explode / Milkrun (2007)
Telephone (2009)

Awards

M Awards
Monday Magazine'''s M Awards are awarded for Victoria’s visual, literary and performing artists. The Paper Cranes have won two awards.

|-
|rowspan=2| 2009 || The Paper Cranes || Favourite Band || 
|-
| Halcyon Days'' || Favourite album of 2008 || 
|-
|rowspan=2| 2007 || The Paper Cranes || Most Promising Band || 
|-
| The Paper Cranes || Victoria's Next Big Thing || 
|-

References

External links
 The Paper Cranes at Indie Update
 The Paper Cranes at Contrastream

Musical groups established in 2005
Musical groups from Victoria, British Columbia
Canadian indie pop groups
2005 establishments in British Columbia